Utricularia hispida is a medium-sized terrestrial carnivorous plant that belongs to the genus Utricularia. Utricularia hispida, which is usually a perennial plant, is endemic to Central and South America.

See also 
 List of Utricularia species

References

External links 

Carnivorous plants of North America
Carnivorous plants of Central America
Carnivorous plants of South America
Flora of Belize
Flora of Bolivia
Flora of Brazil
Flora of Colombia
Flora of French Guiana
Flora of Guatemala
Flora of Guyana
Flora of Mexico
Flora of Nicaragua
Flora of Suriname
Flora of Trinidad and Tobago
Flora of Venezuela
hispida
Taxa named by Jean-Baptiste Lamarck